Henry Shaler Williams (6 March 1847 – July 31, 1918) was an American geologist.

He was the son of State Senator Josiah B. Williams (1810–1883). He graduated from Yale College and studied with Louis Agassiz at Cornell University. In 1871, he taught for a year at Transylvania University and then worked in business with his father in Ithaca, New York until joining the Cornell University faculty in 1879. From 1892 to 1904 he was Professor of Geology at Yale University and Professor of Geology at Cornell University from 1904 until 1912 when he was named Emeritus Professor.

He was a leader in and early member of Sigma Xi honorary society, 1886, and The Geological Society of America, 1888.  He was particularly influential in the development of Sigma Xi, serving as a mentor to the founders and as president of the fledgling organization at Cornell University. Shaler has been credited with naming the Mississippian and Pennsylvanian sub-periods in 1891; the last period names on the geologic time scale to be named.

State Senator Timothy S. Williams (1800–1849) was his uncle; lumber magnate Henry W. Sage (1814–1897) was his first cousin.

Publications
 Geological Biology
 Correlation Papers – Devonian and Carboniferous

References

Additions to the reference list:

BRICE, William R., 2000, Henry Shaler Williams (1847–1918) and the Pennsylvanian Period: Northeastern Geology and Environmental Sciences, v. 22, no. 4, p. 286–293.

BRICE, William R., 2004c, Henry Shaler Williams (1847–1918) and punctuated equilibria: Earth Sciences History, v. 23, no. 1, p. 32–40.

External links
Henry Shaler Williams Papers from the Smithsonian Institution Archives

1847 births
1918 deaths
American geologists
Cornell University faculty
Yale University faculty
Transylvania University faculty
Yale College alumni